Replay is the debut studio album by British Virgin Islands R&B recording artist Iyaz, released in Ireland on 4 June 2010. The album was executively produced by Iyaz's label boss J. R. Rotem and features a special guest appearance from American rapper Flo Rida. It was originally to be titled My Life as a request by Iyaz but was retitled and postponed, in order not to compete with The Ready Set's debut album I'm Alive, I'm Dreaming, also released by Rotem. The album's lead single "Replay" was released on 11 August 2009. The album's second single "Solo" was released on 8 February 2010. "So Big" was released as the album's third single on 21 June 2010.

Track listing 
 All songs written by Iyaz and produced by J. R. Rotem. Others who worked on the songs are given below.

Charts

Release history

References

2010 debut albums
Iyaz albums
Albums produced by J. R. Rotem